Joe Kohlbrand (born March 18, 1963) is a former American football linebacker. He played for the New Orleans Saints from 1985 to 1989.

References

1963 births
Living people
American football linebackers
Miami Hurricanes football players
New Orleans Saints players